is a racing driver from Japan who currently competes in the Super Formula Championship for Team Goh, and the GT300 class of Super GT for Max Racing.

Career
Miyake was the winner of the SRS-F (Suzuka Circuit Racing School Formula) Scholarship in 2018. He made his professional racing debut later that year, in the final round of the FIA F4 Japanese Championship. In 2019, he competed full-time in Japanese F4 as a member of the Honda Formula Dream Project (HFDP). Miyake won the second race of the season at Okayama International Circuit, and went on to finish as runner-up in the championship behind Honda-backed driver Ren Sato.

He stepped up to the GT300 class of Super GT in 2020, driving for series newcomers Max Racing in their Lexus RC F GT3. Miyake stayed with Max Racing for 2021, as they changed vehicles to the GT300 spec Toyota GR Supra. Miyake won his first Super GT race at Suzuka Circuit in August, and alongside co-driver Yuui Tsutsumi, finished fifth in the GT300 drivers' championship. 

After a one-year hiatus, Miyake returned to single-seater racing in the 2021 Super Formula Lights Championship, driving with Rn-sports. He won two races, and scored five podiums, finishing fourth place in the standings. On 7 February 2022, Miyake stepped up to Super Formula, joining Team Goh as their second driver.

Racing records

Career summary

|}
* Season still in progress.

Complete F4 Japanese Championship results
(key) (Races in bold indicate pole position; races in italics indicate points for the fastest lap of top ten finishers)

Complete Super Formula Lights results 
(key) (Races in bold indicate pole position) (Races in italics indicate fastest lap)

Complete Super Formula results 
(key) (Races in bold indicate pole position) (Races in italics indicate fastest lap)

* Season still in progress.

References

External links
 

1999 births
Living people
Japanese racing drivers
Japanese Formula 3 Championship drivers
Super GT drivers
Super Formula drivers
Japanese F4 Championship drivers